Purdil Khan (died 1930) was a Saqqawist politician who served as minister of defence under Habibullāh Kalakāni during the Afghan Civil War of 1928–29, and briefly became the leader of the movement during a rebellion in July 1930.

Personal life 
Purdil was the uncle of Habibullāh Kalakāni.

Role in the 1928–29 civil war 
Purdil was appointed field marshal of the Saqqawist Afghan army in January 1929, following the capture of Kabul. By 24 March, Purdil had become minister of defense.

After the Saqqawist capture of Kandahar, Purdil pleaded to Kalakani that Ali Ahmad Khan be spared, but this was refused.

Purdil took command in the following battles:

 Battle of Maydan, 24 March 1929. Saqqawist victory.
 Battle of Shaykhabad, 9 April 1929. anti-Saqqawist victory.
 Battle of Ghazni, 28 April 1929. Saqqawist victory.
 Siege of Kalat, 19–23 May 1929. Saqqawist victory.
 Capture of Kandahar, 31 May 1929. Saqqawist victory.
 Fall of Kabul, 9–13 October 1929. anti-Saqqawist victory, end of the civil war.

Kuhistan rebellion and death 

After the end of the civil war, Purdil organized a new revolt. In July 1930, Saqqawists fought against state forces in modern-day Kohistan District, Kapisa Province. The rebellion was crushed within a week. After the rebellion was suppressed, 3000 of the rebels were captured and 11 of the ringleaders were executed, while the rest were allowed to go home and "follow some honest pursuit". Purdil was killed during the fighting.

References 

1930 deaths
20th-century Afghan military personnel
Afghan rebels